The Guest Hospital is a hospital in Dudley, West Midlands, England, part of the Dudley Group NHS Foundation Trust

History

Victorian origins
Situated in Tipton Road, Dudley the buildings were originally constructed as almshouses in 1849 by the Earl of Dudley to accommodate workers who had become blind in the limestone pits. In 1871 they were taken over by local chainmaker Joseph Guest. Joseph Guest was an English chainmaker who developed his industry in the Black Country of Central England during the Industrial Revolution of the 19th century. Guest converted them for hospital use.

The 20th century hospital
In 1908, Tipton pawnbroker Hugh Lewis left his entire estate of £80,000 to the hospital.

In March 1922, the hospital treated several victims of the Tipton Catastrophe, a factory explosion in which 24 teenage girls who were dismantling surplus World War I ammunition suffered extensive burns, 19 dying.

Most of the hospital was rebuilt between 1929 and 1939, on the far side not visible from Tipton Road, though part of these new buildings were visible from Birmingham New Road which opened in 1927 and allowed for a second vehicular access point (which was closed in the 1990s). A new pre-fabricated timber/plaster board annex was added in the 1960s, and survived until the hospital's closure.

The hospital's accident and emergency department closed in the spring of 1984 and was relocated to the new Russells Hall Hospital. Around this time, fears were rife in the local area that Guest Hospital was on the verge of closure, but the opening of a new hydrotherapy pool and physiotherapy department in 1986 appeared to silence these fears. However, National Health Service officials announced in July 1990 that they were considering closing the hospital (along with nearby Burton Road Hospital, which ultimately closed in December 1993) and expanding Russells Hall to accommodate replacement facilities, but the hospital survived another 17 years. The former nurse's home at the hospital was demolished in 1996.

New buildings
A new horseshoe-shaped extension was opened in 2003, but the old buildings - including the out-patients department - remained in use until October 2007. Most of the buildings are due to be retained owing to their historic importance, though some of the less significant structures are set to be demolished to make way for a housing development - these include the wards at the rear of the site which were built in the 1930s, as well as the hydrotherapy pool and physiotherapy department. The administration building, former out-patients unit and hospital lodge are set to be retained to form residential properties.

In 2008, it was used to film Ghosthunting with... and stars from I'm a Celebrity... Get Me Out of Here! ghosthunted in parts of the hospital, just six months after it closed. The hospital continues to operate as an out-patient centre.

Gallery

References

External links
Guest Hospital

Buildings and structures completed in 1849
Hospital buildings completed in 1939
Buildings and structures in Dudley
Hospitals in the West Midlands (county)
1849 establishments in England
NHS hospitals in England